The surname Myhill may refer to:

 Boaz Myhill (born 1982), American-born Welsh footballer
 John Myhill (1923—1987), British mathematician
 Kirby Myhill (born 1992), Welsh rugby union player

In mathematics and theoretical computer science, the name appears also in:

 Myhill congruence
 Myhill's constructive set theory
 Myhill graph
 Myhill isomorphism theorem
 Myhill–Nerode theorem
 Myhill's property
 Rice-Myhill-Shapiro theorem